The Society for Andaman and Nicobar Ecology, also known as SANE, is an  environmental organization based in the city of Port Blair, in the Andaman and Nicobar Islands, India. It was formed for the preservation of the Andaman ecosystem.

Involvement
Due to increasingly more contact of Jarawa adivasis of the Andaman Islands, since 1996, previously who were known for their herto fiercely isolationist behaviour, started to emerged from the forest area and made contact with the non-tribal population of the andaman. Due to completion of the National Highway 223 running throughout the andaman from north to south. The organization filed a suit in Calcutta High Court, under which andamanas jurisdiction comes. The case escalated to the Supreme Court of India as a Public Interest Litigation (or PIL).

SANE joined the Bombay Natural History Society and Pune-bare Kalpavriksh in this petition, whichresulted in the High Court passing a judgment in 2001, directing the administration to take steps to protect the Jarawa from encroachment and contact, as well as preemptively ruling out any program that involved relocating the Jarawa to a new reservation. Planned extensions of the highway were also prohibited by the court.  However the Andaman administration decided defying the order by keeping it open and continuing construction due to being the main and important highway and for its economical and social importance.

See also
 Andamanese peoples

References

Organisations based in the Andaman and Nicobar Islands
Environmental organisations based in India
Ecology
Year of establishment missing